

Men's Senior Football Team

Record

Managers of 2014
Included just matches against country.

Goal scorers

Fixtures and results

Friendly Matches

International Friendly 
Source:

1 Non FIFA 'A' international match

Non-International Friendly (against clubs) 
Source:

2015 AFC Asian Cup Qualification

Group C 
Source:

2014 AFF Suzuki Cup

Group A

Men's under-23 Football Team

Record

Managers of 2014
Included just matches against country.

Goal scorers

Fixtures and results

Friendly Matches

International Friendly 
Source:

Non-International Friendly (against clubs)

2016 AFC U-22 Championship qualification

2014 Asian Games

Group E

Round of 16

Men's under-21 Football Team

Record

Managers of 2014
Included just matches against country.

Goal scorers

Fixtures and results

International Friendly

Non-International Friendly (against clubs)

2014 COTIF

Group A

Men's under-19 Football Team

Record

Managers of 2014
Included just matches against country.

Goal scorers

Fixtures and results

Friendly Matches

International Friendly 
Source:

Non-International Friendly (against clubs) 
Source:

2014 Hassanal Bolkiah Trophy

Group B

2014 AFF U-19 Youth Championship

Group A

2014 AFC U-19 Championship

Group B

Men's under-17 Football Team

Record

Managers of 2014
Included just matches against country.

Goal scorers

Fixtures and results

Friendly Matches

International Friendly 
Source:

Non-International Friendly (against clubs)

2014 AFF U-16 Youth Championship

Men's under-14 Football Team

Record

Managers of 2014
Included just matches against country.

Goal scorers

Fixtures and results

Friendly Matches

International Friendly

Non-International Friendly (against clubs)

2014 Japan-ASEAN Football Exchange Programme 

Source:

References 

2014
2014 in Indonesian football
Indonesia